Valienol (streptol) is a C-7 cyclitol similar in structure to valienamine.

References 

Cyclitols
Cyclohexenes